Thomas Hughes (1822–1896) was an English lawyer, Member of Parliament (MP) and author.

Thomas Hughes may also refer to:

Politics
 Thomas Hughes (Australian politician) (1892–1980), Australian state Labor MP in Western Australia
 Thomas Hughes (MP) (1604–1664), Welsh politician who sat in the House of Commons in 1654 and 1659
 Thomas Hughes (Sydney mayor) (1863–1930), Lord Mayor of Sydney, Australia
 Thomas A. Hughes, American politician from Arizona
 Thomas H. Hughes (1769–1839), U.S. Representative from New Jersey
 Tom Hughes (Australian politician) (born 1923), former Member of Australian House of Representatives; former Attorney-General
 Tom Hughes (Oregon politician) (born 1943), former Metro Council President and former mayor of Hillsboro, Oregon

Sports
 Thomas Bridges Hughes (1851–1940), English footballer who scored twice in the 1876 FA Cup Final
 Thomas Hughes (cricketer), English cricketer and diplomat
 Tom Hughes (footballer) (1892–1915), English footballer
 Tom Hughes (outfielder) (1907–1989), Major League Baseball outfielder in 1930
 Tom Hughes (pitcher, born 1878) (1878–1956), Major League Baseball pitcher 1900–1913
 Tom Hughes (pitcher, born 1884) (1884–1961), Major League Baseball pitcher 1906–1918
 Tom Hughes (1950s pitcher) (born 1934), Major League Baseball pitcher in 1959
 Tommy Hughes (athlete) (born 1960), Irish long-distance runner
 Tommy Hughes (Australian footballer) (1886–1981), Australian rules footballer who played with Carlton
 Tommy Hughes (baseball) (1919–1990), professional baseball player who played pitcher
 Tommy Hughes (footballer, born 1947), Scottish former football goalkeeper
 Tommy Hughes (footballer, born 2000), English footballer who plays for Ipswich Town

Others
 Thomas Hughes (dramatist), 16th-century English dramatist and lawyer
 Thomas Hughes (VC) (1885–1942), Irish Victoria Cross recipient
 Thomas Hughes (1888–1914), British soldier who, days before his death, sent a message in a bottle that was recovered in 1999
 Thomas Bayley Hughes, Welsh Anglican priest
 Thomas J.R. Hughes (born 1943), American professor of aerospace engineering
 Thomas L. Hughes (1925–2023), American government officer
 Thomas McKenny Hughes (1832–1917), Welsh geologist
 Thomas P. Hughes (1923–2014), American historian of technology
 Thomas P. Hughes (bishop) (1891–1957), Irish-born Roman Catholic priest in Nigeria
 Thomas Hughes (bishop) (1895–1981), Welsh Anglican priest
 Thomas Hughes (priest) (1838–1911), British missionary with the Church Missionary Society
 Thomas Rowland Hughes (1903–1949), Welsh novelist, dramatist and poet
 Thomas Smart Hughes (1786–1847), English historian
 Tom Hughes (actor) (born 1985), English actor
 Tom Hughes (radio host), formerly radio host with WGST (AM) in Atlanta, Georgia
 Tom Hughes, author of the two-part Gooflumps spoof series under the pseudonym of R.U. Slime

Fictional
 Tom Hughes (As the World Turns), fictional character on soap opera As the World Turns

See also  
 Hughes (surname)